Vanderwagen is an unincorporated community in McKinley County, New Mexico, United States.

Demographics

Education
Gallup-McKinley County Schools is the non-BIE school district. Zoned schools are: David Skeet Elementary School in Vanderwagen, Gallup Middle School, and Hiroshi Miyamura High School.

The Bureau of Indian Affairs operates a K-8 school, Chi Chil'tah Community School, which has a Vanderwagen address but is in Chi Chil Tah.

References

Unincorporated communities in McKinley County, New Mexico
Unincorporated communities in New Mexico